Nyi Min Han (born 17 May 1987) is a Burmese politician who served as a member of parliament in the Mandalay Region Hluttaw for Aungmyethazan Township No. 1 Constituency.

Early life and education
Nyi Min Han was born on 17 May 1987 in Natmauk in Magway Division of Myanmar. He graduated from University of Medicine, Magway with medical degree on 2013.

Political career
He is a member of the National League for Democracy Party. In the 2015 Myanmar general election, he contested the Mandalay Region Hluttaw from Aungmyethazan Township No. 1 parliamentary constituency, winning a majority of 38,872 votes.

References

External links 

National League for Democracy politicians
1978 births
Living people
People from Magway Division
Prisoners and detainees of Myanmar